Rotari may refer to:

 Olga Rotari (born 1989), Moldovan classical musician 
 Rotari, Transnistria, a commune in Moldova
 Pietro Rotari (1707-1762), Italian painter of the Baroque period